Haripur Dimukhi Girls High school is an educational institute from Haripur, Thakurgaon, Bangladesh.

History 
Haripur Dimukhi Girls High school was established on 1 September 1983 on a 1.63 acre land as a women's school with the help of the then Upazila Executive officer and local educationists.

Descriptions 
Haripur Dimukhi Girls High School is located in Haripur Upazila Sadar area of Thakurgaon district. The school has opportunities for girls from all religions to study. The school has two buildings. There is a wide field in the middle of the school. The school library has more than 200 books. At present the school has science and humanities departments.

Teachers and students 
The school teaches 6th to 10th class. There are 20 teachers with almost 350 students.

References 

Schools in Bangladesh
Educational Institutions in Bangladesh
Educational institutions established in 1983
1983 establishments in Bangladesh